Karen Davis is a fictional character from The Grudge. Being the central character, she uncovers the Saeki house's dark past and is the only one to survive the first film. She returns in The Grudge 2 and compels her sister, Aubrey, to put a stop to the curse. Her portrayal was met with acclaim by critics and the films crew. She makes a cameo appearance in The Grudge 3 with a flashback scene.

Character arc

The Grudge 
Karen Davis (Sarah Michelle Gellar) is the main protagonist of The Grudge. She is an American social worker who moves with her boyfriend, Doug, to Tokyo. She volunteers to take care of a woman named Emma Williams when Emma's first caretaker, Yoko, does not show up to work. When Kayako Saeki, an undead woman bound to a curse, starts killing people around her, she starts investigating the curse's origin. She decides to head back to the house to keep Doug from falling to the curse, but fails. Karen then tries to stop the curse by burning down the house, but this instead releases the curse.

The Grudge 1.5 
In the animated short film The Grudge 1.5, Karen is rescued by a young Chinese journalist, Eason when he arrives the house on fire to find Detective Nakagawa, but he saves Karen before they were attacked by Kayako and the two make it out alive and Karen is taken to the hospital.

The Grudge 2 
The second installment reveals that Karen was hospitalized after the events of the first film. She is now paranoid, traumatized, and frantic to stop Kayako. She is visited by her sister Aubrey, who was sent by their mother. Later, Kayako resurfaces and grabs her arm; panicked, she frees herself and evades Kayako and the police. When she reaches the roof of the hospital, she backs away to the edge of the roof and Kayako pulls her off to her death.

Reception 
Gellar received praise for her performance in the first film, and Roger Ebert referenced her performance as the reason for the film's success.

Casting 
Before Gellar was cast, numerous other actresses were suggested, such as Selma Blair; the two of them had previously starred together in the teen movie Cruel Intentions. The role eventually went to Gellar, who was known for her work in horror films such as I Know What You Did Last Summer and Scream 2.

See also 
 Kayako Saeki
 Aubrey Davis

References 

The Grudge (film series)
Film characters introduced in 2004
Fictional social workers
Final girls
Sony Pictures characters